Luca Biagini (born 3 October 1949) is an Italian actor and voice actor.

Biography
Biagini is best known for dubbing over the voices of actors like Hugo Weaving in The Lord of the Rings film series, Michael Keaton in Batman and Spotlight, Arliss Howard in Full Metal Jacket, J.K. Simmons in Whiplash, Bruce Willis in 12 Monkeys, Ed Harris in The Hours, Colin Firth, John Malkovich and Kevin Kline in most of their performances.

In 2010, he became the new official voice of Hugh Laurie in House, after the death of his former dubber Sergio Di Stefano.

He gave as well his voice to animated characters such as Tigger from Winnie the Pooh since The Tigger Movie, Sebastian St. Clair in BoJack Horseman, Jake from The Rescuers Down Under and the Rat from Fantastic Mr. Fox.

Dubbing roles

Animation 
 Jake in The Rescuers Down Under
 Tigger in Winnie the Pooh (since 1999)
 Kent Mansley in The Iron Giant
 Rameses II in The Prince of Egypt
 Clair in BoJack Horseman
 Mark Griff in Stanley
 Qwerty in VeggieTales
 Percy Polie in Rolie Polie Olie
 Arty Smartypants in Between the Lions
 Whitey in Flushed Away
 Jack the Dog in Bear in the Big Blue House
 Ray Liotta in Bee Movie
 Henry the Green Engine Thomas and the Magic Railroad
 Andy in Tomodachi Life: The TV Series
 Papa Q. Bear in The Berenstain Bears
 The Wicked King in Sarah Lee Jones and the Magic Village
 Zartog in Space Chimps
 Jack in Blue's Clues
 Papu in Oobi
 Andre in The Tale of Despereaux
 Rat in Fantastic Mr. Fox
 Grimble in Legend of the Guardians: The Owls of Ga'Hoole
 Clyde in Wreck-It Ralph
 Prince John in Tom and Jerry: Robin Hood and His Merry Mouse
 Leonardo da Vinci in Mr. Peabody and Sherman

Live action 
 Gregory House in House (seasons 7–8)
 Elrond in The Lord of the Rings
 Batman in Batman
 Walter V. Robinson in Spotlight
 Private/Sergeant Cowboy in Full Metal Jacket
 Terence Fletcher in Whiplash
 James Cole in 12 Monkeys
 Richard "Richie" Brown in The Hours
 Wally the Great in The Wiggles Movie
 Atticus Finch in To Kill a Mockingbird (1999 redub)
 Geoffrey Clifton in The English Patient
 Harry Hart / Galahad in Kingsman: The Secret Service
 Cyrus Grissom in Con Air
 John Malkovich in Being John Malkovich
 Humma Kavula in The Hitchhiker's Guide to the Galaxy
 Galbatorix in Eragon
 Osbourne Cox in Burn After Reading
 Lucien Laurin in Secretariat
 Quentin Turnbull in Jonah Hex
 Marvin Boggs in Red
 Donald Vidrine in Deepwater Horizon
 Dave Kovic / Bill Mitchell in Dave
 Alvin in No Strings Attached

References

External links
 
 

1949 births
Living people
People from the Province of Siena
Italian male voice actors
Italian male film actors
Italian male television actors
Italian male stage actors
20th-century Italian male actors
21st-century Italian male actors